Catephia scotosa is a species of moth of the  family Erebidae. It is found in Gabon.

References

Catephia
Moths described in 1894
Moths of Africa